Harrison County is a county located in the U.S. state of Kentucky. As of the 2020 census, the population was 18,692.  Its county seat is Cynthiana. The county was founded in 1793 and named for Colonel Benjamin Harrison, an advocate for Kentucky statehood, framer of the Kentucky Constitution, and Kentucky legislator.

History
Harrison County was formed on December 21, 1793, from portions of Bourbon and Scott Counties. Harrison was the 17th Kentucky county in order of formation. It was named after Colonel Benjamin Harrison, an early settler in the area.

The First Battle of Cynthiana was on July 17, 1862, part of Col. John Hunt Morgan's First Kentucky Raid. Morgan's Last Kentucky Raid included on June 11–12, 1864 the Civil War Second Battle of Cynthiana which was fought near Keller's Bridge and the later site of Battle of Grove Cemetery. On the first day, Confederate General John Hunt Morgan and his 1,200 Kentucky cavalrymen captured the town, making prisoners of its Union garrison (five companies from the 168th Ohio Infantry Regiment and a small group of local home guards) and nearly the entire 171st Ohio Infantry Regiment later that morning. Despite being low on ammunition, Morgan chose to stay and fight the enemy forces he knew were on their way. Union General Stephen G. Burbridge and his 2,400 cavalry and mounted infantry attacked him the next morning, driving the outnumbered Confederates from the town and freeing the prisoners.

Geography

Major highways
  US 27
  US 62
  KY 36
  KY 32
  KY 356

Adjacent counties
 Pendleton County  (north)
 Bracken County  (northeast)
 Robertson County  (northeast)
 Nicholas County (southeast)
 Bourbon County  (southeast)
 Scott County  (southwest)
 Grant County  (northwest)

Demographics

As of the census of 2000, there were 17,983 people, 7,012 households, and 5,062 families residing in the county. The racial makeup of the county was 95.65% White, 2.52% Black or African American, 0.28% Native American, 0.13% Asian, 0.02% Pacific Islander, 0.63% from other races, and 0.77% from two or more races.  1.15% of the population were Hispanic or Latino of any race.

There were 7,012 households, out of which 33.50% had children under the age of 18 living with them, 58.00% were married couples living together, 10.30% had a female householder with no husband present, and 27.80% were non-families. 24.00% of all households were made up of individuals, and 11.20% had someone living alone who was 65 years of age or older.  The average household size was 2.53 and the average family size was 2.99.

In the county, the population was spread out, with 25.00% under the age of 18, 8.20% from 18 to 24, 29.80% from 25 to 44, 23.60% from 45 to 64, and 13.40% who were 65 years of age or older.  The median age was 37 years. For every 100 females there were 95.00 males.  For every 100 females age 18 and over, there were 92.50 males.

The median income for a household in the county was $36,210, and the median income for a family was $42,065. Males had a median income of $31,045 versus $23,268 for females. The per capita income for the county was $17,478.  About 9.40% of families and 12.00% of the population were below the poverty line, including 15.80% of those under age 18 and 10.70% of those age 65 or over.

Communities

Cities
 Berry
 Cynthiana (county seat)

Unincorporated communities

 Boyd
 Breckinridge
 Broadwell
 Buena Vista
 Colville
 Connersville
 Claysville
 Hooktown
 Lair
 Lees Lick
 Leesburg
 Kelat
 Morningglory
 Oddville
 Poindexter
 Ruddels Mills
 Rutland
 Shadynook
 Shawhan
 Sunrise

Politics

See also

 List of counties in Kentucky
 National Register of Historic Places listings in Harrison County, Kentucky

Further reading
 Kentucky Rebel Town: The Civil War Battles of Cynthiana and Harrison County by William A. Penn, 2016, University Press of Kentucky

References

 
1793 establishments in Kentucky
Populated places established in 1793